Lorenzo "Ka Tanny" Martinez Tañada Sr. CCLH (born Lorenzo Tañada y Martínez; August 10, 1898 – May 28, 1992) was a Filipino nationalist, lawyer, solicitor general, senator, national athlete, and human and civil rights defender. Serving in the Philippine Senate for 24 years beginning in 1947 up until 1971, he is the longest-serving senator in Philippine history (tied with Franklin Drilon and Tito Sotto), and is referred to as the "Grand Old Man of Philippine Politics."

He was best known for his many contributions to Philippine nationalism and independence. As first post-war solicitor general, longest serving senator for 24 years, and staunch opposition to martial law under Ferdinand Marcos. He is also equally renowned for his efforts to stop the continued presence of US military bases in the Philippines through the Anti-Bases Coalition (ABC). 

Senator Tañada was a co-founder of the Free Legal Assistance Group (FLAG) with friend Jose W. Diokno. FLAG is the largest group of human rights lawyers nationwide. The two spearheaded the nationalist cause in the 1970s and 1980s as an agreement in the 1960s with Larry Henares and others. Tañada was also the chairman of the Justice for Aquino, Justice for All (JAJA) movement that sought to oust Marcos after the assassination of former Sen. Ninoy Aquino. 

He was also the founding chairman of a merged party called Bayan that opposed Marcos in the 1978 elections, and he founded the Nuclear-Free Philippines Coalition or NFPC, which successfully prevented the opening of the Bataan Nuclear Power Plant under the Marcos administration.

In his youth, he was also a national football team goalkeeper and was part of the Philippine national team that bagged silver medals at the 1923 and 1925 Far Eastern Championship Games, the precursor to the famous Asian Games.

He is the father of former Philippine Senator Wigberto Tañada and the grandfather of former Deputy Speaker Erin Tañada.

Early life

Tañada was born in Gumaca, Quezon on 10 August 1898, the son of Vicente Tañada, who served as the last gobernadorcillo of Gumaca town in Quezon under the Spanish colonial government, and Anastacia Martinez-Tañada. His actions in life were governed by the philosophy ingrained in him by his mother. The phrase "fear of God is the start of wisdom" guided him in all his social dealings.

As an elementary student in Gumaca, he joined a protest against his school's American principal. The protest was prompted by the principal's order for school children to stay during weekends to build a playground, which prevented them from going home to their parents. Tañada said he was the smallest child and remembered when the principal was shocked to see he was one of the complainants. This was considered to be his very first rally.

In 1915, Tañada moved to the new De La Salle College, Manila, now called De La Salle University or DLSU, a school run by the Christian Brothers and graduated at the top of the class in 1918. He claimed it was the first time he saw his mother very emotional as she pinned the special medal on Tañada's breast during the ceremony.

As a law student at the University of the Philippines (U.P.), Tañada, completed his Reserve Officers' Training Corps (ROTC) prior to the academic Philippine educational system and obtained the rank of major, and was a lead actor in plays. He was also a national football team goalkeeper and was part of the Philippine national team that bagged silver medals at the 1923 and 1925 Far Eastern Championship Games, the precursor to the Asian Games.

As a college student, during U.P.'s Armistice Day, he we would exhort "his fellow cadets to take their training seriously as they will soon be called upon to use their skill against the Americans if the country's independence is not granted".

He recalled being allowed to make this speech at the request of the Filipino administrators. Though after the speech the Filipino administrators told him to resign from the ROTC before the American general may try to punish him. In 1924 he topped the government's examination for pensionados and obtained a free scholarship to study in the U.S. In 1928, he earned his Master of Laws from Harvard University. He was the principal protégé of American Supreme Court justice Felix Frankfurter. He also acquired a Doctor in Civil Law meritissimus from the University of Santo Tomas.

In 1947, together with prominent justices and lawyers, they founded the MLQ Law School, which became the Manuel L. Quezon University in 1958 upon signing of the charter granted by the Ministry of Education, Sports and Culture. The Monzon Hall is currently situated in R. Hidalgo Street while the Law Building is at Arlegui Street. Tañada was also a founder of the Civil Liberties Union in 1937 together with friend J.B.L. Reyes.

Political career

Tañada served as the pre-war and first post-war solicitor general from 1940-1941 and 1945-1947, tasked with the monumental collaboration cases against many prominent figures, where he earned the respect and admiration of many of his peers and countrymen.

Tañada was first elected to the Philippine senate in 1947 where he topped the elections, placing 1st among senatorial candidates, the first of his 4 successful senatorial elections.

Tañada was the chief prosecutor against Japanese collaborators. Due to his political reputation, Tañada became a Filipino praised by all sectors of Philippine society, a person honored by both the Communist Party of the Philippines and the Reform the Armed Forces Movement, and a man who was acknowledged as a man of principles even by Benigno Aquino, Sr., grandfather of Pres. Benigno Aquino, whom Tañada himself once charged as a "collaborator".

He was a petitioner in the landmark Supreme Court case Tañada vs. Tuvera, which declared that unpublished laws (a characteristic of the Presidential Decrees of Marcos) are without effect.

Tañada was also a longtime opponent of the U.S. role in the Philippines. He was the organizer of the Anti-Bases Coalition (ABC) together with lawyer and former senator Jose W. Diokno and also led other groups that rallied public opposition to the presence of American troops in the Philippines.

Tañada is often called the "grand old man of Philippine politics", due to his reputation as one of the Philippine's foremost nationalists. He was a familiar fixture during the Martial law era of Ferdinand Marcos, leading rallies and demonstrations being the founding chairperson of Bagong Alyansang Makabayan. Due to his esteem among national democrats, Tañada chaired some national democrats coalitions in his later years to oppose Marcos in the streets.

After Marcos' opponent, Ninoy Aquino, was assassinated, JAJA was formed with co-leader Diokno, who is called the father of human rights advocacy, which made JAJA the first united front built to stop Marcos. Tañada was elected the chair of the alliance. However, JAJA could not unite the different competing groups and ideologies, and eventually former members left to form different alliances, with the largest being the Kongreso ng Mamamayang Pilipino (Congress of the Filipino People) or "KOMPIL", of which Tañada served as one of the chief delegates.

During Corazon Aquino's presidency, he was a staunch anti-U.S. Bases activist and an anti-nuclear power plant advocate.

On September 16, 1991, Tañada received a standing ovation from the Philippine Senate after its rejection of a new lease for the U.S. Naval Base Subic Bay, which was the last American military installation in the Philippines.

Later life and legacy
Tañada died in 1992, on the way to a hospital, at the age of 93. Days before his death, Tañada had already been undergoing kidney dialysis. He was survived by his wife, Expedita Ebarle-Tañada, nine children, including his son former Senator Wigberto Tañada, and some grandchildren, and including his grandson Erin Tañada. Tañada also is survived by his great grandchildren and great-great grandchildren. He is buried at Loyola Memorial Park.

He received the Philippine Legion of Honor, highest rank of Chief Commander (CCLH) in 1988.

In his in hometown of Gumaca, Quezon, August 10 is celebrated every year as Lorenzo M. Tañada Day, a special non-working holiday.

He was a 1988 The Outstanding Filipino (TOFIL) awardee for Freedom Advocacy. His son Wigberto Tañada also received a TOFIL award in 1999 for Government and Public Service.

Tañada's name is inscribed on the Bantayog ng mga Bayani Wall of Remembrance, which recognizes heroes who fought against martial law in the Philippines under Ferdinand E. Marcos.

There have been movements and calls, as well as bills have been filed in both senate and house of representatives in the 16th Philippine Congress, to rename Commonwealth avenue to Sen. Lorenzo Tañada avenue, to honor his legacy of Filipino nationalism and independence. Other calls have been made to rename Marcos Highway to Lorenzo Tañada Ave.; along with Shaw Blvd. to Jovito Salonga Blvd.; Taft Ave. to Jose Diokno Ave.; and Imelda Ave. to Sen. Geronima Pengson Ave. De La Salle University put up a special museum called the Lorenzo M. Tañada Memorabilia Room as a permanent part of the campus. Visits require early appointments. They have also instituted the Lorenzo M. Tañada CHIMES Award for faculty. The De La Salle University Tañada-Diokno College of Law was named in his and "Ka Pepe" Diokno's honor on Diokno's centennial on February 26, 2022.

Books about his life include;

 The Essential Tañada by Renato Constantino published in 1989
 The Odyssey of Lorenzo Tañada by Agnes Bailen published 1998
 Lorenzo M. Tañada, in celebration of his 100th birth anniversary, 1898-1998 published by the Lorenzo M. Tañada Foundation in 1998 
 Lorenzo M. Tañada as Others Saw Him: Contemporaneous Observations on a Filipino Leader and Hero by Jose N. Endriga published in 1998

Other features include "Lorenzo Tañada, Brief life of a Philippine patriot: 1898-1992" by Christopher Capozzola, in the Nov-Dec 2020 issue of Harvard Magazine, "Sen. Lorenzo Tañada Sr. – national heartthrob" by Argyll Geducos, Mario Casayuran, and Hannah Torregoza published August 5, 2018, and "A Tañada Dynasty or Legacy?" published by Action for Economic Reforms in March 2013.

Notes

References

1898 births
1992 deaths
Senators of the 7th Congress of the Philippines
Senators of the 6th Congress of the Philippines
Senators of the 5th Congress of the Philippines
Senators of the 4th Congress of the Philippines
Senators of the 3rd Congress of the Philippines
Senators of the 2nd Congress of the Philippines
Senators of the 1st Congress of the Philippines
Solicitors General of the Philippines
20th-century Filipino lawyers
Filipino democracy activists
Harvard Law School alumni
Politicians from Quezon
University of the Philippines Manila alumni
University of Santo Tomas alumni
Chief Commanders of the Philippine Legion of Honor
Lorenzo
Roxas administration personnel
Osmeña administration personnel
Candidates in the 1957 Philippine vice-presidential election
Filipino footballers
Philippines international footballers
Association football goalkeepers
Individuals honored at the Bantayog ng mga Bayani
Marcos martial law victims
Lawyers honored at the Bantayog ng mga Bayani